The 1958–59 British Home Championship was a football tournament played between the British Home Nations. It came the year after the notable failure of England and Scotland to impress at the 1958 FIFA World Cup, for which all four nations qualified for the only time. Wales and Northern Ireland were the only achievers, both reaching the quarter-finals after playoffs.

Many of these problems stemmed also from the deaths of a number of international players from some teams in the Munich Air Disaster the year before. During the Home Championship, the Ireland team took the unusual step of flying to Madrid for a friendly game against Spain between the matches against England and Scotland. The trip was, however, not a success, the Irish losing 2–6 with goals from Billy Bingham and Jimmy McIlroy.

For the second successive year, the tournament was tied between England and Ireland, as both managed a draw and a win against the other two teams in addition to the high-scoring mutual draw which began the competition. Scotland came second after comfortably beating Wales, drawing with the Irish but then narrowly losing to England in London, which cost them a share of first place. Wales recovered from their defeat to the Scots to draw with England in the second match but lost heavily to the Irish in their final game, and so finished last.

Table

Results

References

1958-59
1958–59 in Northern Ireland association football
1958–59 in English football
1958–59 in Scottish football
1958–59 in Welsh football
1958 in British sport
1959 in British sport